Jan van der Merwe may refer to:

 Jan van der Merwe (athlete), a South African athlete
 Jan van der Merwe (rugby union), a South African rugby union player
 Jan van der Merwe (wrestler), a South African Olympic wrestler
 Jan H van der Merwe, a South African physicist